Nathan Robitaille is a Canadian sound editor. He is best known for his work on the film The Shape of Water (2017), for which he was nominated for an Academy Award and a British Academy Film Award.

Education
In 2000, Robitaille graduated from Fanshawe College, where he studied Music Industry Arts and Audio Post Production programs.

Awards and nominations
Major awards

Academy Awards

British Academy Film Awards

Canadian Screen Awards

Genie Awards

Primetime Emmy Awards

References

External links
 

Living people
Canadian sound editors
Fanshawe College alumni
Best Sound Editing Genie and Canadian Screen Award winners
Year of birth missing (living people)
Place of birth missing (living people)